HCV may refer to:
 Halcyonair, a defunct Cape Verdean airline
 Hepatitis C virus
 High conservation value area
 Higher calorific value; see Heat of combustion
 Housing choice voucher
 Housing Commission of Victoria, in Australia